Jette Olsen is a Danish curler and curling coach.

Teams

Record as a coach of national teams

References

External links
 

Living people
Danish female curlers
World curling champions
Danish curling champions
Danish curling coaches
Year of birth missing (living people)